The 2017–18 Rhode Island Rams basketball team represented the University of Rhode Island during the 2017–18 NCAA Division I men's basketball season. The Rams, led by sixth-year head coach Dan Hurley, played their home games at the Ryan Center in Kingston, Rhode Island as members of the Atlantic 10 Conference. They finished the season 26–8, 15–3 in A-10 play to finish win the A-10 regular season championship. They defeated VCU and Saint Joseph's to advance to the championship game of the A-10 tournament where they lost to Davidson. They received an at-large bid to the NCAA tournament where they defeated Oklahoma in the first round before losing in the second round to Duke.

On March 22, 2018, it was announced that head coach Dan Hurley had accepted the head coaching job at Connecticut. On April 4, assistant coach David Cox was promoted to head coach.

Previous season
The Rams finished the 2016–17 season 25–10, 13–5 in A-10 play to finish in a tie for third place. In the A-10 tournament, they defeated St. Bonaventure, Davidson, and VCU to win the A-10 Tournament championship. As a result, they received the conference's automatic bid to the NCAA tournament as the No. 11 seed in the Midwest region. They received a No. 11 seed in the Midwest region where they defeated No. 6-seeded Creighton in the first round before losing to No. 3-seeded Oregon in the second round.

Offseason

Departures

Incoming transfers

2017 recruiting class

2018 recruiting class

Preseason 
In a poll of the league’s head coaches and select media members at the conference's media day, the Rams were picked to win the A-10, receiving 27 of 28 first place votes. E.C. Matthews was selected to the conference's preseason first team while Jared Terrell was picked for the preseason second team.

Roster

Schedule and results

|-
!colspan=9 style=|Exhibition

|-
!colspan=9 style=| Non-conference regular season

|-
!colspan=12 style=| Atlantic 10 regular season

|-
!colspan=9 style=| Atlantic 10 tournament

|-
!colspan=9 style=| NCAA tournament
|-

|-

Source

Rankings

*AP does not release post-NCAA tournament rankings

See also
 2017–18 Rhode Island Rams women's basketball team

References

Rhode Island Rams men's basketball seasons
Rhode Island
Rhode Island